Alvaro Bishaj (born 2 October 1991) is an Albanian footballer who plays for KF Devolli in the Kategoria e Dytë.

Career
On 23 January 2020, Bishaj signed a one-year contract with Kategoria e Dytë club KF Devolli.

Honours

Club
Flamurtari 
Albanian Cup: (2)  2008–09 , 2013–14

Tirana
 Albanian Supercup: (1) 2017
 Albanian First Division : Winner Group B
 Albanian First Division : 2017-2018

References

External links
 Player profile from Flamurtari Vlorë official website

1991 births
Living people
Footballers from Vlorë
Albanian footballers
Association football central defenders
Flamurtari Vlorë players
FK Tomori Berat players
KF Korabi Peshkopi players
KS Sopoti Librazhd players
KF Tirana players